Liz Lawrence (born 9 July 1990) is an English singer, songwriter and guitarist, known for her solo work and for being half of electro-pop duo Cash+David.

She has toured with Bombay Bicycle Club,
 and supported Black, Scouting for Girls, and Ani DiFranco, amongst others. Q magazine compared Lawrence favourably to indie rock band Florence and the Machine, considering her "a starlet in the making".

Career
Having played in various bands in her youth before embarking on a solo career and relocating to London, Lawrence's debut studio album, Bedroom Hero, was released in 2012, reaching No. 2 on the Bandcamp album chart. In February 2017, Lawrence featured on the song "Party for Two" from the album The Pace of the Passing by former Bombay Bicycle Club member Ed Nash's solo project, Toothless. 2018 saw the release of singles "The Good Part" and "Woman"; the former was mixed by Bombay Bicycle Club's Jack Steadman. Her second album, Pity Party, was released on October 25, 2019. NME called the album "powerful" and considered that it "embraces her lo-fi folk past but also brings it into the here and now with satisfying pop elements" Lawrence featured as a vocalist on Bombay Bicycle Club's 2020 album Everything Else Has Gone Wrong. On September 17, 2021, Lawrence’s third album “The Avalanche” was released.

Discography

Albums

Singles

References

External links
 
 

1990 births
Living people
21st-century English women singers
21st-century English singers
English women singer-songwriters
Musicians from London